Leng Kee Single Member Constituency was a constituency in Singapore. In 1972, Leng Kee Constituency was formed by carving out from Bukit Merah Constituency. In 1988, it was renamed as Leng Kee Single Member Constituency (SMC) as part of Singapore's political reforms. The SMC was merged into Tanjong Pagar Group Representation Constituency in 1997.

Member of Parliament

Elections

Elections in 1970s

References 

Singaporean electoral divisions
Bukit Merah